Heinz Edgar Lehmann  (July 17, 1911 – April 7, 1999) was a German-born Canadian psychiatrist best known for his use of chlorpromazine for the treatment of schizophrenia in 1950s and "truly the father of modern psychopharmacology."

Early life
Born in Berlin, Germany, he was educated at the University of Freiburg, the University of Marburg, the University of Vienna, and the University of Berlin. He emigrated to Canada in 1937. 
Beginning his new life working at the Montreal Children's Hospital in Montreal where he improved his English until he was appointed junior psychiatrist at then Verdun Protestant Hospital, now called Douglas Mental Health University Institute, on the eve of the Second World War. He lived on the grounds of this hospital where he met his future wife Annette, a nurse, and their son François was born in 1944.

Hospital work in Canada
In 1947, he was appointed the clinical director of Montreal's Douglas Hospital. From 1971 to 1975, he was the chair of the McGill University Department of Psychiatry. He was also a humane lecturer in psychiatry in 1952, and was able to give empathetic lectures on the plight of people suffering from anxiety, depression obsessions, paranoia etc. No one at that time had been able to understand or help psychotic and depressed patients, who filled mental hospitals around the world, so when the first big breakthrough chlorpromazine(Largactil) arrived from France in 1953 and then imipramine (Tofranil), which came from German-speaking Switzerland in 1958, they both showed promise. He helped to promote them in North America which ignited the drug revolution. He was ahead of his time in that he supported research in the use of the active ingredient psilocybin to alleviate anxiety.

Early Clinical Drug Evaluation Unit (ECDEU) 
In 1961 Dr. Lehmann became involved in a new US Public Health Service Program initiative which met to exchange observations and findings on new psychotropics. Although based in Montreal, Canada, it became one of the first units in this network. He invited Thomas A. Ban, his senior psychiatrist and chief of the clinical research service at the hospital, to become his co-principal investigator.  This began a close collaboration over an 18-year period that researched most of the psychotropic drugs marketed in North America during the 1960s and 70s. Their findings and observations were shared internationally in articles and at conferences and had a profound impact on the evolution of psychopharmacology as a discipline.

Le Dain Commission
From 1969 to 1972, he was one of the five members of the Le Dain Commission, a royal commission appointed in Canada to study the non-medical use of drugs. He was an advocate for decriminalization of marijuana.

DSM work
In 1973, he was a member of the Nomenclature Committee of the American Psychiatric Association that decided to drop homosexuality from the Diagnostic and Statistical Manual of Mental Disorders, i.e. to depathologize it.

Honors and awards
In acknowledgment of his important contributions, he received the Lasker Award in 1957 and the Stratton Award of the American Psychopathological Association in 1962.  In 1970 he was made a Fellow of the Royal Society of Canada and, in 1976, he was made an Officer of the Order of Canada. He was inducted into the Canadian Medical Hall of Fame in 1998.

Heinz Lehmann Award
In 1999, the Canadian College of Neuropsychopharmacology established the Heinz Lehmann Award in his honor, given in recognition of outstanding contributions to research in neuropsychopharmacology in Canada. There are also several other awards including the Heinz Lehmann Award of Excellence of the Quebec Psychiatric Association; and the Heinz E. Lehmann Research Award, which was established by the New York State Office of Mental Health.

References

 
 

1911 births
1999 deaths
Canadian psychiatrists
Fellows of the Royal Society of Canada
German emigrants to Canada
Officers of the Order of Canada
Academic staff of McGill University
Physicians from Berlin
20th-century Canadian physicians
Recipients of the Lasker-DeBakey Clinical Medical Research Award